North Key Largo is an unincorporated area and census-designated place (CDP) in Monroe County, Florida, United States. The population was 1,431 at the 2020 census, up from 1,244 in 2010. It includes two private clubs, the Ocean Reef Club and the Key Largo Anglers Club, and is reached from the mainland via the Card Sound Bridge.

Geography
North Key Largo is located in the northern part of the Florida Keys at  (25.289586, -80.306813). It occupies the northern  of the island of Key Largo and is bordered to the south by the community of Key Largo. To the west, separating the island from the mainland, are Barnes Sound and Card Sound. Palo Alto Key is to the north, and the Atlantic Ocean is to the east.

Demographics

As of the census of 2000, there were 1,049 people, 565 households, and 376 families living in the CDP.  The population density was 21.6/km (55.9/sq mi).  There were 1,620 housing units at an average density of 33.3/km (86.3/sq mi).  The racial makeup of the CDP was 98.47% White, 0.76% African American, 0.19% Asian, 0.10% from other races, and 0.48% from two or more races. Hispanic or Latino of any race were 2.67% of the population.

There were 565 households, out of which 7.8% had children under the age of 18 living with them, 63.7% were married couples living together, 2.5% had a female householder with no husband present, and 33.3% were non-families. 29.7% of all households were made up of individuals, and 15.9% had someone living alone who was 65 years of age or older.  The average household size was 1.86 and the average family size was 2.22.

In the CDP, the population was spread out, with 6.7% under the age of 18, 2.0% from 18 to 24, 12.0% from 25 to 44, 32.1% from 45 to 64, and 47.2% who were 65 years of age or older.  The median age was 64 years. For every 100 females, there were 91.8 males.  For every 100 females age 18 and over, there were 92.7 males.

The median income for a household in the CDP was $88,709, and the median income for a family was $125,000. Males had a median income of $49,861 versus $50,833 for females. The per capita income for the CDP was $83,199.  None of the families and 0.5% of the population were living below the poverty line, including no under eighteens and 0.8% of those over 64.

Education
It is in the Monroe County School District. It is zoned to Key Largo School (K-8).

References

External links
History of North Key Largo
Brief History of Linderman Key

Census-designated places in Monroe County, Florida
Census-designated places in Florida
Key Largo
Populated coastal places in Florida on the Atlantic Ocean